De Perfil (Profile view) is a 1966 novel by José Agustín. Like his first novel, La Tumba, De Perfil was a best-seller, and furthered  Agustin's reputation as a writer.

Set in Mexico City, specifically in an urban middle-class neighborhood in the 1960s,  the novel covers in detail three days in the life of the main character, an unnamed young man who is going to enter high school. 

The novel is longer and more complex, yet more polished and natural than La Tumba. It does not have a particular theme or purpose, following the main character most of the time, in the present, first person. X is rebellious but his naivety and inexperience embarrasses him from time to time. To protect himself he would assume an experienced or indifferent air, but he is aware of his hypocrisy.  By the novel's end, the reader has felt what is like to be X, and reads a kind of wild dream of his future as boyfriend of Queta and student leader, and of his past as a tiny baby in his mother's arms.

Plot summary

The novel opens with the phrase "Behind the rock is the world I live in" and the reader finds him smoking cigarettes in his home's garden, hiding from his parents behind a big rock. (In Mexico it is common but not compulsory to live with one's parents until marriage, even if one has the means to support oneself).

The son of a psychiatrist and a housewife, he has a younger brother he can not stand because he is acting like his psychiatrist father all the time. Also, he assume that his parents could divorce and have doubts about his birth (X jokes that he is adopted).  His friend Ricardo is timid and naive, having bold ideas he never dares put to practice, and when he does, he usually makes a joke of himself. Ricardo is very attached to X, the closest thing to a name the main character gets in the novel (given by Ricardo in one of his "confidential" plans in his diary), but X thinks Ricardo is too childish. No one can think that Ricardo has a crush on X, but he has an absence in the father figure pattern, substituting X even if he tortures him all the time.
X meets many kinds of people: a fledgling music group about to make their first record (Los suásticos) and their homosexual manager, a young and rich female singer (Queta) with which he have an affair, his flamboyant and cynical neighbor Octavio, who does not have any aspirations but only to be a rock star even though he does not belong to a band, his intellectual cousin (Esteban) who fights X''' for his conventional lifestyle and more characters, most with some artistic or intellectual aspiration, including student leaders, highly politicized (a future vision of events that will happen in the next five years in Mexico).

Major themes
The narrative is fluid and changing, most of the time X'''s thoughts in the first person, written in different styles. There are also memories, the point of view of a different character, a few flashbacks from his family past, and finally a technique very common in Jose Agustin's work: mixing the character's speech with the narrative, without making any distinction, typographical or punctuation, leaving it to the reader to discern which character is speaking. Other times spacing and font size delineate speech.

1966 novels
Novels by José Agustín
Novels set in Mexico City